Louisiana Downs Casino & Racetrack is a horse racing track and racino located in Bossier City in northwestern Louisiana. It opened in 1974. The casino features over 800 slot machines.

History
Louisiana Downs was built by shopping center developer Edward J. DeBartolo Sr., of Cleveland, Ohio, a longtime supporter of horse racing; it was third race track that he developed, along with Thistledown in North Randall, Ohio, and Remington Park in Oklahoma City, Oklahoma.

In its first year of operation, more than 300,000 wagered in excess of $23 million. In 1983, 1.3 million fans wagered $224 million in the 125-day racing season.

Harrah's Entertainment (later Caesars Entertainment) purchased the track in 2002. In October 2017, ownership of the property was transferred to Vici Properties as part of a corporate spin-off, and it was leased back to Caesars.

In September 2020, it was announced that Caesars Entertainment and VICI Properties are selling Harrah’s Louisiana Downs to Rubico Acquisition Corp. for $22 million with the deal expected to close at the end of the year or early in 2021.

In November 2021, the sale to Rubico Acquisition Corp was completed and the property transitioned to Louisiana Downs Casino & Racetrack dropping the Harrah's moniker.

Racing
The Thoroughbred meet takes place from early May through late September or early October. A quarter horse meet is held from January through March.

It also hosts the Tiznow Handicap.

References

 https://www.ksla.com/2021/11/01/rubico-acquisition-corporation-officially-takes-over-louisiana-downs/]</ref>

External links 
 Louisiana Downs official web site

Tourist attractions in Bossier Parish, Louisiana
Casinos in Louisiana
Horse racing venues in Louisiana
Sports venues in Shreveport, Louisiana
Sports venues in Louisiana
Buildings and structures completed in 1974
Buildings and structures in Bossier City, Louisiana
Sports venues completed in 1974